John Frank Ewan Bone (28 August 1930 – 5 July 2014) was the area Bishop of Reading (Church of England) from 1989 until 1996.

He was educated at Monkton Combe School and St Peter's College, Oxford (gaining an Oxford Master of Arts {MA Oxon}) before embarking on an ecclesiastical career with a curacy at St Gabriel's, Warwick Square. After  incumbencies at Datchet  and Slough he was appointed Rural Dean of Burnham and then (his final appointment before ordination to the episcopacy) Archdeacon of Buckingham.

He died in 2014: his Church Times obituary stated that he was "a great example of the quiet, reliable bishop who was trusted by many, worked hard, and never sought the limelight. "

References

1930 births
2014 deaths
People educated at Monkton Combe School
Alumni of St Peter's College, Oxford
Archdeacons of Buckingham
Bishops of Reading
20th-century Church of England bishops